John Henry Tait (21 August 1871 – 23 September 1955) was an Australian film and theatre entrepreneur who often worked with his brothers Charles, Nevin, Edward and Frank.

John Tait was born in Castlemaine, Victoria, the son of John Turnbull Tait (1830–1902), a tailor from Scalloway, Shetland Islands, Scotland, and his English wife Sarah, née Leeming. John Tait migrated to Victoria in 1862 and settled at Castlemaine where he married Sarah. They had nine children: including Charles (1868–1933), John (1871–1955), James Nevin (1876–1961), Edward Joseph (1878–1947) and Frank Samuel (1883–1965) (later Sir Frank). John was educated at Castlemaine State School before the Taits moved in about 1879 to Richmond, a suburb of Melbourne, Victoria.

John originally worked as a lawyer before going into the theatre. He managed Dame Nellie Melba's 1902 tour of Australia for George Musgrove. He later became a concert promoter. In March 1911, brothers John and Nevin, and Millard Johnson and William Gibson merged their film interests in Amalgamated Pictures and became a noted theatre producer.

References

1871 births
1955 deaths
Australian theatre managers and producers
Australian people of Scottish descent
People from Castlemaine, Victoria